The Ospreys, formerly the Neath-Swansea Ospreys is one of the four professional rugby union teams from Wales. They compete in the United Rugby Championship and the European Rugby Champions Cup. The team formed as a result of Neath RFC and Swansea RFC combining to create a new merged entity, as part of the new regional structure of Welsh rugby, that began in 2003. They are also affiliated with a number of local semi-professional and amateur clubs, including Welsh Premier Division sides Aberavon RFC, Bridgend Ravens, and original founding clubs Neath and Swansea. The regional area represented by the team has widely become known for rugby purposes as 'Ospreylia'.

Their main home ground is the Swansea.com Stadium, Swansea, although some smaller profile games have been played at the Brewery Field, Bridgend. Ospreys currently play in a black home strip, while the away strip is white and orange. The Ospreys logo consists of an image of an Osprey mask.

The Ospreys are the most successful Welsh team in the history of the Celtic League or Pro12 tournament, having won the competition four times. They also became the first and only Welsh regional team to beat a major touring side, defeating  24–16 in 2006.

History

Infancy
On 24 July 2003 it was announced that the new team jointly representing Neath RFC and Swansea RFC would be known as the Neath-Swansea Ospreys. The Ospreys part of the team's name was inspired by the use of the bird as Swansea RFC's centenary badge. Former Neath RFC coach Lyn Jones was appointed as head coach, who named Scott Gibbs as the team's first captain. 5 September 2003 saw the region play their first competitive game, a 41–30 Celtic League home win over Irish province Ulster at The Gnoll in Neath. Leeds Tykes were the Ospreys' first Heineken Cup opponents, with the English team triumphing 29–20 on 7 December 2003. They struggled to recover from their opening defeat, finishing bottom of their pool, recording their only victory against the Tykes' at home in the final round at St. Helens. Domestically the Ospreys' did salvage some pride, avoiding becoming the lowest placed Welsh region, by pipping Cardiff Blues to fifth place in the Celtic League.

Following the demise of the Celtic Warriors region on 1 June 2004, Neath-Swansea Ospreys had their borders extended to cover much of the Bridgend and Ogmore areas to the east. However, for logistical reasons it was decided that no home games would be played at Bridgend RFC's Brewery Field. Former Warriors players David Bishop, Brent Cockbain, Ryan Jones and Sonny Parker were signed by the Ospreys'.

2004–2007

The 2004–05 season saw significant on field improvement for the region. A capacity crowd of 10,280 was present at The Gnoll on 26 March 2005 to witness the Ospreys claim their first piece of silverware. A 29–12 win over Edinburgh, with two rounds of the competition still remaining, saw the team crowned Celtic League champions. However, impressive back to back wins over Harlequins were not enough to overcome Munster in the pool stages of that season's Heineken Cup. On 14 May 2005 it was announced that the 'Neath-Swansea' part of the team's name would be dropped, with them to be referred to as the Ospreys.

A growing sense of expectation surrounded the team heading into 2005–06, an expectation they struggled to cope with, finishing a disappointing seventh in the Celtic League. A difficult Heineken Cup pool made up of tough opposition in Leicester Tigers, Stade Francais and ASM Clermont Auvergne proved too difficult, as they finished a distant third. A gutsy home victory over Stade and a last gasp defeat to Leicester, did however offer some crumbs of comfort. In April 2006 it was announced that noted former New Zealand All Blacks scrum half Justin Marshall had signed to play for Ospreys.

The Ospreys won the Celtic League during the 2006/07 season, topping the league by a single point and taking the title with an away win at Borders.  Winning the Celtic League for a second time meant the Ospreys were the first team to have won the Celtic League twice. In February 2008, the Ospreys provided 13 of the starting line-up for Wales in their Six Nations match against England, setting a new record for the number of players from one region playing for their national side. During the 2007/08 season the Ospreys reached Quarter-final of the Heineken Cup for the first time but unexpectedly lost to Saracens. The following week they won the EDF Energy Cup beating Leicester Tigers at Twickenham.

In November 2006 when it became apparent that Wales 'A' would not be able to face Australia A national rugby union team midweek during their November tour, the Ospreys became the first Welsh region to play a major international side since regional rugby was introduced, a match they won 24–16. Following the win over the Wallabies, the term Ospreylia became ingrained in popular culture with it being adopted by the region and its supporters as a description of the geographical area covered by the region, with supporters known as Ospreylians. Peter Black, Assembly Member for south west Wales has declared himself as AM for Ospreylia on his own blog.

On 23 February 2007, the Ospreys played their first 'A' team match, against Newport-Gwent Dragons 'A' at Bridgend, which was the first 'A' match fixture for any of the Welsh regional sides. They lost the match 22–10. They have since gone on to play Worcester 'A' in April, a game which they lost 24–23 to an injury-time penalty.

2008–2011
In February 2008 Andrew Hore was appointed as the Ospreys as elite performance director. Previously Hore had been high performance manager with the New Zealand Rugby Union.

A disappointing seventh-place finish in the Celtic League and a surprise Heineken Cup quarter-final exit to Saracens F.C. saw head coach Lyn Jones resign at the end of the 2007–08 season, on 16 May 2008 Assistant Coach Sean Holley and forwards coach Jonathan Humphreys would continue as part of a new management structure being overseen by Andrew Hore, until a replacement could be found. Scott Johnson, the former head coach of the Welsh national team, and attack coach when Wales won the Six Nations Championship Grand Slam in 2005 for the first time in 27 years, was announced as director of coaching at the Ospreys on 29 January 2009.

On 21 April 2009, the Ospreys had six players included in the British & Irish Lions' squad for the 2009 South African tour: Lee Byrne (fullback), Tommy Bowe and Shane Williams (wings), Mike Phillips (scrum-half), Alun Wyn Jones (lock) and Adam Jones (prop). One notable omission however, was Wales and Ospreys captain Ryan Jones. The Ospreys announced the signing of former New Zealand All Blacks captain Jerry Collins on 9 May 2009. Collins had been a stalwart for the All Blacks, since 2004 but retired from international rugby in 2008.

A 29–28 defeat by Biarritz on 10 April 2010 dashed the team's hopes of a first Heineken Cup semi-final appearance. A late Nicky Walker try in San Sebastien proved in vain. However, on 29 May 2010, the Ospreys won the 2009–10 Celtic League by defeating Leinster in the final by 17–12 at the RDS Arena in Dublin.

Following a wide-ranging review, Andrew Hore, previously elite performance director at the Ospreys, became on 26 April 2011 chief operations officer at the region.

2010–11 would not see the region reach the heights of the previous one. Despite winning all their home pool games in the Heineken Cup, a failure to win on the road proved costly, with Munster and Toulon progressing instead. Another win for Munster at Thomond Park on 14 May 2011, ended the Ospreys Celtic League aspirations at the semi-final stage.

2012–2018

Former player Steve Tandy was appointed as new Ospreys head coach on 15 February 2012 replacing Sean Holley in the role, as Scott Johnson also departed to take up a coaching role with Scotland. Both Holley and Johnson's final game as part of the coaching setup at the Liberty Stadium had been a 36–5 away loss to Biarritz, which marked the end of a Heineken Cup campaign that saw them again fail to win on their travels. New coach Tandy enjoyed a successful start to his tenure, winning eight of his first ten matches as full-time Head Coach, including winning the 2011–12 Pro12 following a 31–30 win over Leinster at the RDS, thanks to a late Shane Williams try in his final match for the region 29–30 and Dan Biggar adding a difficult conversion for the win 31–30. Ospreys have reached 2 semi-finals in the subsequent 6 seasons, but not made the final. 

Following a poor start to the 2017–2018 season, Tandy was sacked by the Ospreys. Forwards coach Allen Clarke took over on an interim basis, before agreeing to a three year deal as head coach.

2018– 
For the 2018–2019 season, along with new head coach Clarke, Matt Sherratt joined the coaching staff, replacing Gruff Rees. The season also began with notable squad changes, with record points scorer Dan Biggar departing for Northampton Saints, and stalwart Paul James retiring. The Ospreys were boosted with the signings of Welsh internationals George North, Scott Williams, and Aled Davies. The season saw a modest improvement fot the Ospreys, winning 12 matches and losing 9, as well as beating west Wales rivals the Scarlets for a Champions Cup place.

Season records

Celtic League / Pro12 / Pro14 / URC

Celtic Cup

Heineken Cup / Rugby Champions Cup

Rugby Challenge Cup

Anglo-Welsh Cup

Home grounds

In their first two seasons, the Ospreys shared their home games between St Helen's (home ground of Swansea RFC) and The Gnoll (home ground of Neath RFC). Since their third season in 2005–06, they have played at the purpose-built 20,000 seat Liberty Stadium in Landore, Swansea, which is shared with Swansea City. The Liberty Stadium, with double the capacity of St Helen's, has seen a capacity crowd for the matches against international tourists Australia 'A' team (1 November 2006) and against local rivals the Scarlets. On 12 November 2010 the team played their first competitive fixture at the Brewery Field home ground of Bridgend Ravens in the Anglo-Welsh Cup.

Kit suppliers
From their foundation to the 2013–14 season, the Ospreys kit suppliers were Kooga. Between the seasons 2014–2017, BLK supplied the Ospreys kits. Canterbury supplied the kits for the 2018–2021 seasons. Starting for the 2021/22 season, the Ospreys would form a kit partnership with Umbro.

Current standings

Current squad

Development Squad

Management & Coaching staff
Management

Coaching

Notable players & coaches

Welsh Internationals
The following players have represented Wales internationally and represented the Ospreys.

British & Irish Lions
The following players were selected for the British & Irish Lions touring squads while contracted to the Ospreys:
 Brent Cockbain: 2005
 Gavin Henson: 2005
 Ryan Jones: 2005, 2009
 Shane Williams: 2005, 2009
 Tommy Bowe: 2009
 Lee Byrne: 2009
 Adam Jones: 2009, 2013
 Alun Wyn Jones: 2009, 2013, 2017, 2021
 Mike Phillips: 2009
 James Hook: 2009
 Richard Hibbard: 2013
 Ian Evans: 2013
 Justin Tipuric: 2013, 2017, 2021
 Dan Biggar: 2017
 Rhys Webb: 2017
 Adam Beard: 2021

Centurions
Players who have reached the 100 appearance mark for the Ospreys. The first numbers in brackets are the years they represented the Ospreys, while the second numbers in bold are the number of caps they received. Caps updated on 4 March 2023.

Notable non-Welsh internationals

Notable non-Welsh players who have international caps with a Tier One or Two nation and represented the Ospreys.

Former Coaches
 Lyn Jones (2003–2008)
 Sean Holley (2008–2012)
 Steve Tandy (2012–2018)
 Allen Clarke (2018–2019)
 Carl Hogg & Matt Sherratt (interim) (2019–2020)

Honours 
Celtic League/Pro12/United Rugby Championship:
Winners: 2004–05, 2006–07, 2009–10, 2011–12
Welsh Shield Winners: 2021-22
 Anglo-Welsh Cup
Winners: 2007–08
Runners-up: 2006–07

ERC Elite Awards
During the 10th anniversary season of the Heineken Cup, ERC, the tournament organisers, introduced the ERC Elite Awards to recognise players and teams who have made outstanding contributions to the tournament.

Ospreys were awarded the ERC team award for playing 50 games.

Ospreys players who have been awarded 50 tournament caps are:
Ian Gough
Adam Jones
Duncan Jones
Shane Williams
Jonathan Thomas
Sonny Parker

See also
 Pro14
 Anglo-Welsh Cup
 Heineken Cup
 European Challenge Cup

Footnotes

External links
 Official website
 Ospreys on itsrugby.co.uk
 Aberavon RFC (official site)
 Bridgend RFC (official site)
 Neath RFC (official site)
 Swansea RFC (official site)

 
Welsh rugby union teams
Rugby union in Swansea
Rugby union in Neath Port Talbot
Rugby clubs established in 2003
United Rugby Championship teams